Herman David Purcell (August 15, 1923 – December 24, 2005) was an American Negro league pitcher in the 1940s.

A native of St. Louis, Missouri, Purcell was signed by the Cleveland Buckeyes before the 1944 season. In 1947, he played for the Memphis Red Sox. He died in Grand Rapids, Michigan in 2005 at age 82.

References

External links
 and Seamheads

1923 births
2005 deaths
Memphis Red Sox players
Baseball pitchers
Baseball players from St. Louis
20th-century African-American sportspeople
21st-century African-American people